Yağcılar is a village in the Şirvan District of Siirt Province in Turkey. The village had a population of 754 in 2021.

The hamlets of Asmaladere, Gözlü, Kaynnarca and Sütlü are attached to the village.

References 

Kurdish settlements in Siirt Province
Villages in Şirvan District